Acinetobacter cumulans is a bacterium from the genus of Acinetobacter which has been isolated from hospital sewage from China. Acinetobacter cumulans is resistant against clinically important antibiotics.

References

Moraxellaceae
Bacteria described in 2019